The Page ministry (Country–United Australia Coalition) was the 24th ministry of the Government of Australia. It was led by the country's 11th Prime Minister, Sir Earle Page. The Page ministry succeeded the Fourth Lyons ministry, which dissolved on 7 April 1939 following the death of former Prime Minister Joseph Lyons - the first of three occasions where a sitting Prime Minister died in office. Since Page was the head of the Country Party, it was a caretaker ministry until the senior partner in the Coalition, the United Australia Party, could elect a new leader. Former Attorney-General Robert Menzies was ultimately elected on 18 April 1939. However, due to the Country Party withdrawing from the Coalition after relations between Page and Menzies broke down, Menzies along with his ministry was not sworn in until 26 April 1939.

John McEwen, who died in 1980, was the last surviving member of the Page ministry; McEwen was also the last surviving member of the Fourth Lyons ministry. Robert Menzies was the last surviving UAP minister.

Ministry

Notes

Ministries of George VI
Australian Commonwealth ministries
1939 establishments in Australia
1939 disestablishments in Australia
Cabinets established in 1939
Cabinets disestablished in 1939